Ronnie Clayton (9 February 19238 December 1999) was a British boxer, born in Blackpool, Lancashire whose career highlight was winning the British Empire and European featherweight titles in 1947.

Boxing career 
Clayton was born on 9 February 1923 in Lancashire, England. He and his two brothers Jackie and Syd all chose boxing as a profession.

He became a professional boxer in 1941 and was trained by his brother, Jackie at their gym in Blackpool. He was managed throughout his thirteen-year boxing career by George Dingley. He had thirteen Championship bouts that included a bantamweight championship against world champion Jackie Patterson, and non-title bouts against South African champion Vic Toweel, Jackie Turpin, Manuel Ortiz and Spider Kelly.

In the second World War, he served with the Fleet Air Arm (FAA), the English Naval Air Force, in the early 1940s but continued to box, often in Liverpool.  While working with the Naval Air Force, he lost to Joe Curran on 26 August 1943, in a ten round decision in Liverpool.  During his service, his most memorable match, fought for the British Empire bantamweight title was his loss to future world champion Jackie Patterson, which ended in a loss when he failed to return for the 12th round.  The two boxers fought in Liverpool before a crowd of 18,000.

On 27 March 1947, he defeated Joe Carter in a fifth round knockout in Liverpool, in an important eliminator bout for the British featherweight title.

Three British feather titles
Clayton won three titles on 11 September 1947 for a purse of £2,000, by defeating Al Phillips in a fifteen round decision in Liverpool.  These included the British Empire, British (British Boxing Board of Control), and European featherweight titles.

His first successful defence of his two British titles was against Johnny Molloy in a fifteen round decision in Nottingham on 11 April 1949.

He held the British Empire featherweight title for five years, until he was defeated by Roy Ankrah in a fifteen round decision in Kensington on 30 April 1951. He held the European featherweight title for only one year, losing it to French boxer Ray Famechon in a fifteen round decision in Nottingham on 22 March 1948.

On 21 April 1952, he attempted to retake the European featherweight title in Nottingham against Ray Famechon, but lost the match in a fifth round TKO.

Regaining British feather title
He regained the British featherweight title with a victory over Dai Davies in a fifth round TKO on 30 June 1952 in Abergavenny, making him the exceptional winner of two Lonsdale belts in his career.

He defended his British featherweight title on 12 May 1953 in a fourth round knockout against Freddie King in Harringay.

His fifth round loss to South African Vic Toweel, former holder of the World bantamweight title, on 12 December 1953 in Johannesburg was his only recorded bout fought outside of the United Kingdom.

In his last bout on 1 June 1954, he lost his British featherweight title to Sammy McCarthy in London's White City, quitting in the eighth round when he experienced a loss of vision that apparently ended his boxing career.  McCarthy was an aspiring London boxer, eight years younger than Clayton.  In an interview a few days after the fight, Clayton admitted to having had very little vision in his left eye through much of his boxing career, and announced his boxing retirement.

He died on 8 December 1999, in Blackpool, the city of his birth, and was buried there in a ceremony that included many of the leading boxers of his era.

In October 2006 the silver-gilt featherweight Lonsdale Belt won outright by Clayton in 1953 was auctioned by Bonhams as part of a sporting memorabilia sale for £2,938.

Selected fights

|-
| align="center" colspan=8|7 Wins, 5 Losses
|-
| align="center" style="border-style: none none solid solid; background: #e3e3e3"|Result
| align="center" style="border-style: none none solid solid; background: #e3e3e3"|Opponent(s)
| align="center" style="border-style: none none solid solid; background: #e3e3e3"|Date
| align="center" style="border-style: none none solid solid; background: #e3e3e3"|Location
| align="center" style="border-style: none none solid solid; background: #e3e3e3"|Duration
| align="center" style="border-style: none none solid solid; background: #e3e3e3"|Notes
|-
| Win
| Joe Carter
| 27 Mar 1947
| Liverpool
| 5 Round KO 
| Eliminator for British featherweight title (BBBofC) 
|-
| Win
| Al Phillips
| 11 Sep 1947
| Liverpool
| 15 Rounds 
| Won European, Brit. Emp. and British featherweight titles 
|-
| Win
| Johnny Molloy
| 11 April 1949
| Nottingham
| 15 Rounds 
| Kept European, Brit. Emp. and British featherweight titles 
|-
| Win
| Eddie Miller
| 11 Aug 1949
| Liverpool
| 12 Round KO
| Kept Brit. Emp. featherweight title 
|-
| Loss
| Ray Famechon
| 18 Nov 1949
| Manchester
| 15 Rounds 
| Lost European featherweight title|-
| Win
| Al Phillips
| 26 Feb 1951
| Nottingham
| 15 Rounds 
| Kept Brit. Emp. and British featherweight titles 
|-
| Loss
| Roy Ankrah
| 30 Apr 1951
| Kensington
| 15 Rounds
| Lost Brit. Emp. featherweight title 
|-
| Loss
| Roy Ankrah
| 25 Feb 1952
| Nottingham
| 13th Round returned to corner 
| For Brit. Emp. featherweight title  
|-
| Loss
| Ray Famechon
| 21 Apr 1952
| Nottingham
| 5th Round TKO 
| For European featherweight title  
|-
| Win
| Dai Davies
| 30 June 1952
| Abergavenny
| 5th Round TKO 
| Regained British (BBBofC) featherweight title (2nd time) 
|-
| Win
| Freddie King
| 12 May 1953
| Harringay
| 4 Round KO 
| Kept British (BBBofC) featherweight title 
|-
| Loss
| Sammy McCarthy
| 1 June 1954
| White City, London 
| 8 Rounds, Quit fight 
| Lost British (BBBofC) featherweight title''' 
|-

See also 
 List of British featherweight boxing champions

References 

English male boxers
Featherweight boxers
Sportspeople from Blackpool
1923 births
1999 deaths